Morpho niepelti  is a Neotropical butterfly.

Description
Morpho niepelti is a large butterfly. The forewings have a concave outer edge and the outer edge of the hindwing is very scalloped. The upperside is more or less dark blue with a very dark marginal band and a very dark strip that runs along two-thirds of the costal edge of the forewing. The underside is brown with a line of ocelli.

Distribution
Morpho niepelti  is an endemic species found only in Colombia.

Taxonomy
Morpho niepelti was described by Julius Röber in 1927 under the initial name Morpho theseus staudingeri.

Etymology
The name honours Friedrich Wilhelm Niepelt.

References
Le Moult (E.) & Réal (P.), 1962-1963. Les Morpho d'Amérique du Sud et Centrale, Editions du cabinet entomologique E. Le Moult, Paris.

External links
 "Morpho Fabricius, 1807" at Markku Savela's Lepidoptera and Some Other Life Forms
 External images of types

Morpho
Nymphalidae of South America
Butterflies described in 1927